Scoundrels and Scallywags: Characters from Alberta's Past, originally published in 2002 by Fifth House under , is a book of short biographical profiles written by Irish-Canadian author Brian Brennan. It's a sequel to Building a Province: 60 Alberta Lives, which Brennan published in 2000, and Alberta Originals, which appeared in 2001.

Feature stories about the book appeared in the Calgary Herald, Edmonton Journal and Edmonton Sun

The book was on the Calgary Herald best-sellers list for nineteen weeks, rising to number one on the third week.

The featured individuals in the book include the following:

John Rowand
Henry Davis
James Cornwall
Thomas Bland Strange
Isaac Barr
Paddy Nolan
Caroline Fulham
William Sherman
Bill Peyto
Emilio Picariello
Florence Lassandro
Ernest Cashel
Pearl Miller
John Edward Brownlee
Vivian MacMillan
Guy Weadick
Florence LaDue
Robert "Streetcar" Brown Sr.
Robert "Bobby" Brown Jr.
Fred Speed
Harold McMasters
John Maloney
Maurice King
Harrold King
Julia Kiniski
James Audett
Pete Jamieson
Arthur Dyson
Frank Cebuliak
Donald Hugh Mackay
Fred Perceval
Richard Johnston
Elizabeth Abbott
John Kushner
Elizabeth Hewes
Bud Olson
Tommy Common
D'arcy Scott
Dorothy Joudrie
Toto Miller
Owen Hart

Citations

2002 non-fiction books
History of Alberta
Fitzhenry & Whiteside books